Teodor Laço (6 September 1936, Dardhë – 15 October 2016 Tirana) was an Albanian writer and diplomat.

Biography
He studied agronomy at the University of Tirana, and made his debut as a writer in 1965 with the novel Era e tokës, although he is best known for his 1971 novel Toka e Ashpër, describing the collectivization of a small village.

After 1976, he also wrote screenplays in collaboration with Kinostudio Shqipëria e Re. He later became the manager of the editorial board for the studio's feature films. In 1990 he became head of the Kinostudio, then renamed as "Albfilm".

In 1991, he was one of the founders and a leader of Social Democratic Party of Albania. The following year, he was elected to the Albanian Parliament and served for twelve years. From 1994 to 1997, he was the Minister of Culture. In 1998, he helped create the Liberal Union Party of Albania and was elected its leader in 2001. He also served as the Albanian ambassador to the Russian Federation from 2006 to 2010.

Works

His works include:
Era e tokës (The Wind of the Earth), 1965
Shtëpia në rrugicë (The House on the Alley), 1968
Një nuse për Stasin (A Story Bride), 1970
Tokë e ashpër (Hard Ground), 1987
Korbat mbi mermer (The Rooks on the Marble), 1981
Të gjithë lumenjtë rrjedhin (All Rivers flow), 1987
Pushimet e kolonelit (The Colonel's Vacations), 1990
Shi në plazh (Rain on the Beach)
Vrasja e buzëqeshjes (The Murder of the Smile)
Një dritare në Kremlin (A Window in the Kremlin)
Mjegull (Fog), 2009
Gropas 67, 2014

References 

1936 births
2016 deaths
Ambassadors of Albania to Russia
20th-century Albanian politicians
21st-century Albanian politicians
Agricultural University of Tirana alumni
People from Korçë
Albanian male writers
Albanian male short story writers
Albanian short story writers
Albanian novelists
20th-century Albanian writers
21st-century Albanian writers
Government ministers of Albania
Culture ministers of Albania
20th-century short story writers
21st-century short story writers
20th-century male writers
21st-century male writers